Paul D. Zimmerman (July 3, 1938 in New York City, New York – March 2, 1993 in Princeton, New Jersey) was a screenwriter, film critic and activist.

Biography
He was a film critic for Newsweek magazine from 1967 to 1975, and wrote for television shows including Sesame Street, but is best known for writing The King of Comedy (1982), directed by Martin Scorsese. He was the co-writer of Lovers and Liars (1979) and Consuming Passions (1988)

Zimmerman was the author of many other screenplays, mostly unproduced, as well as the books The Open Man, The Year the Mets Lost Last Place and The Marx Brothers at the Movies (1968).

Active in the Nuclear Freeze movement, he managed to become a member of the Pennsylvania delegation to the Republican Party convention in 1984 in order to be the only person to vote against Ronald Reagan.

Zimmerman died of colon cancer.

Accolades

References

External links
 

1938 births
1993 deaths
American anti–nuclear weapons activists
American film critics
American male screenwriters
Amherst College alumni
Deaths from cancer in New Jersey
Writers from New York City
American male non-fiction writers
Screenwriters from New York (state)
20th-century American male writers
20th-century American screenwriters
Best Original Screenplay BAFTA Award winners